Cremastinae is a worldwide  subfamily of the parasitic wasp family Ichneumonidae. 
 
Cremastinae are koinobiont endoparasitoids of Lepidoptera and, sometimes, Coleoptera larvae in tunnels, leaf rolls, buds and galls.

Genera

Belesica
Celor
Creagura
Cremastus
Dimophora
Dolichopselephus
Eiphosoma
Eucremastoides
Eucremastus
Eurygenys
Eutanygaster
Fafana
Gahus
Kasparyania
Mecotes
Narolskyia
Neleothymus
Nothocremastus
Noxocremastus
Pimplomorpha
Polyconus
Pristomerus
Pseudocremastus
Pseuderipternus
Ptilobaptus
Ricrena
Sustenus
Tanychela
Temelucha
Trathala
Xiphosomella

References
Townes, H.K. (1971): Genera of Ichneumonidae, Part 4 (Cremastinae, Phrudinae, Tersilochinae, Ophioninae, Mesochorinae, Metopiinae, Anomalinae, Acaenitinae, Microleptinae, Orthopelmatinae, Collyriinae, Orthocentrinae, Diplazontinae). Memoirs of the American Entomological Institute 17: 1–372.

External links
Diagnostic characters
 Waspweb

Ichneumonidae
Apocrita subfamilies